Club Deportivo Santa Ponsa was a Spanish football club based in Santa Ponsa, in the island of Mallorca, in the Balearic Islands. Founded in 1972 and dissolved in 1990, the club played for two seasons in Tercera División and one season in Segunda División B.

History
Founded in 1972, the club achieved four consecutive promotions starting in 1985, moving from the Segunda Regional straight to Segunda División B. After an immediate relegation in the 1988–89 season, the club played a further season in Tercera División before merging with CD Cade Paguera and CD Maganova-Juve to create CF Platges de Calvià.

Other related clubs
Club Deportivo Santa Ponsa — (1972–1990)
Real Club Deportivo Santa Ponsa – (?–2008)
Santa Ponsa Club de Fútbol – (2011–)
Sporting Santa Ponsa Talarrubias — (2016–)

Season to season

1 season in Segunda División B
2 season in Tercera División

References

External links
Fútbol Regional team profile 

Defunct football clubs in the Balearic Islands
Association football clubs established in 1972
Association football clubs disestablished in 1990
1972 establishments in Spain
1990 disestablishments in Spain